Netspace was one of Australia's major Internet service providers. 

Netspace started in 1992 by Stuart Marburg and Richard Preen, the business initially offering dial-up internet access, as was the standard at the time. The company was headquartered in Camberwell, a suburb of Melbourne, Victoria.

Netspace was an earlier adopter of DSL in Australia and quickly focused primarily on selling ADSL-based Internet access. It initially resold Telstra ADSL and then installed its own DSLAMs in some locations, including Tasmania.  The business sold services to retail, SoHo and business customers. Products included DNS, co-location, web hosting and VoIP, as well as core internet products. 

On 29 March 2010, an agreement was entered into under which Netspace would be acquired by the larger ASX-listed ISP, iiNet, for AU$40 million. The company soon retired Netspace as brand. Netspace's official website redirects to the webpage of iiNet, but Netspace email addresses continue to be supported.

See also
 Internet in Australia

References

External links
 

Internet service providers of Australia
Telecommunications companies established in 1992
IiNet acquisitions
Telecommunications companies disestablished in 2010
Australian companies established in 1992
Australian companies disestablished in 2010
2010 mergers and acquisitions